North Twin Island is one of the Apostle Islands in northern Wisconsin, in Lake Superior, and is part of the Apostle Islands National Lakeshore.

Notes

Apostle Islands
Islands of Ashland County, Wisconsin